The Northern Open is a golf tournament played annually in Scotland since 1931. For some years it was one of only two 72-hole tournaments on the "Tartan Tour", the PGA Tour in Scotland's schedule, the other being the Scottish PGA Championship, but since 2019 the event has been played over 36 holes.

The Scottish PGA Championship was originally called the Scottish Professional Championship and was only open to professionals while the Northern Open was also open to amateurs.

History
The tournaments were originally played over 2 days with 2 rounds played each day. In 1947 the event was extended to a third day with one round played on the first two days. The leading 50 players and those tied for 50th place played two rounds on the third day. Originally called the "Northern Open Amateur and Professional Golf Tournament", the name was changed "Northern Open Championship" for 1948. The 1948 event was reduced to two days again with play in groups of three on the first day and a cut reducing the field to 80 for the final day. With a large number of entries the 1949 event was again played over three days. The playoff between Ballingall and Thomson was played at Murcar, the day after the Championship finished. The day had been allocated for Scottish qualifying for the Daily Mail Tournament. Thomson practised in the morning while Ballingall played a competitive round. The two played together in the afternoon, Ballingale scoring 72 to Thomson's 74.

Winners

Source:

Notes

References

Golf tournaments in Scotland
Sport in Moray
Sport in Aberdeenshire
Sport in Highland (council area)
Sports competitions in Aberdeen
Annual sporting events in the United Kingdom
Recurring sporting events established in 1931
1931 establishments in Scotland